The Collegium Musicum was one of several types of musical societies that arose in German and German-Swiss cities and towns during the Reformation and thrived into the mid-18th century.

Though closed amateur societies in concept, collegia frequently included professionals to fill out the music and admitted non-members to performances. Moreover, they often provided music for church, state, and academic occasions and gained the patronage of leading citizens. From the 1660s, their functions largely constituted the beginnings of public concert life in Germany.

Leipzig

Leipzig collegia musica, consisting mostly of university students, enjoyed a succession of particularly illustrious directors, including Johann Kuhnau (1688), refounded by Telemann (1702), and Bach (1729–1737), who composed several concertos and dramme per musica for weekly performances at Café Zimmermann, Gottfried Zimmerman's coffeehouse, and for "extraordinary" concerts.  Telemann went on to promote professional concerts by Frankfurt and Hamburg collegia in the late 1720s, thus fostering the emergence of public subscription concerts in Germany.  With the Moravian emigration, American collegia sprang up beginning in 1744 in Pennsylvania, Maryland, Ohio, and the Carolinas.

In 1909, Hugo Riemann refounded the Leipzig collegium within the University, initiating a widespread modern trend in German and American universities to foster the performance of early music on original instruments or replicas.  The term collegium musicum has thus come to be associated in large measure with university ensembles that perform early music, though from a historical perspective, the term need not imply any restriction in repertory.

Other cities
Although the  became the most famous, due to its association with Bach, other cities had similar institutions. The Collegium Musicum (Hamburg) was an amateur musical ensemble founded in Hamburg in the 17th century by Matthias Weckmann, as a complement to the professional Hamburger Ratsmusik.

Modern ensembles
Various modern ensembles have taken the name, including:
 Cambridge University Collegium Musicum
 The Collegium Musicum of University of Heidelberg
 The Collegium musicum Bonn of University of Bonn
 The Collegium Musicum of Martin Luther University of Halle-Wittenberg
 The Collegium Musicum of London
 Collegium Musicum Jamaica
 The Collegium Musicum of the Eastman School of Music, University of Rochester
 The Harvard-Radcliffe Collegium Musicum
 The Collegium Musicum of Columbia University
 The Collegium Musicum of Duke University
 The Collegium Musicum of the University of Arizona
 The Collegium Musicum of Moravian College
Collegium Musicum of Muhlenberg College
 The Collegium Musicum of the University of Notre Dame
 Collegium Musicum 90, an English baroque orchestra
 Collegium Musicum Basle, Switzerland
 Collegium Musicum Bergen, Bergen, Norway
 Collegium Musicum Den Haag, The Netherlands
 L.S.K.O. Collegium Musicum Leiden, The Netherlands
 Rutgers Collegium Musicum
 Collegium Musicum Oberliniense
 The Collegium Musicum of Reed College
 Collegium Musicum of St. Olaf College
 Collegium Musicum of Rowan University
 Collegium Musicum, a Slovak art rock band formed by Marián Varga
 The Collegium Musicum of Colorado College
 Collegium Musicum of Luther College 
 Collegium Musicum Hong Kong
 Collegium Musicum de Buenos Aires 
 Collegium Musicum Cabell Midland High School
 The Yale Collegium Musicum (founded by Paul Hindemith)
 The University of Toronto Collegium Musicum (directed by Ivars Taurins)
 Collegium Musicum Lviv (Ukraine)
 Collegium Musicum of University of Calgary
 Collegium Musicum of University of Connecticut
 Collegium Musicum of Warsaw University
 Collegium Musicum of Karlsruhe_Institute_of_Technology

References

External links 
 Collegium Musicum of London
 Harvard-Radcliffe Collegium Musicum
 Collegium Musicum of Columbia University
 Collegium Musicum of the University of Notre Dame
 Collegium Musicum of Leiden, the Netherlands
 Collegium Musicum Den Haag, The Netherlands
 Collegium Musicum Basel, Switzerland
 Rutgers Collegium Musicum
 Collegium Musicum of Saint Olaf College
 Collegium Musicum of the University of Texas at Austin
 Chiemgau Collegia Musica
 Collegium Musicum Hong Kong
 Collegium Musicum of University of Calgary
 Collegium Musicum of the University of Connecticut
 Collegium Musicum of Warsaw University
 Collegium musicum Bonn
 Collegium Musicum de Buenos Aires

Baroque music
Mixed early music groups